Gustavo Wilches Tumbia (born 23 August 1962) is a Colombian former road cyclist. He notably won the Vuelta a Colombia and the Clásico RCN in 1990. He also rode in the 1988 and 1990 Vuelta a España. His brothers Pablo, Ricardo and Marcos were also cyclists.

In 2001, Wilches was arrested and charged for attempting to smuggle 40 capsules of heroin through the El Dorado International Airport.

Major results
1986
 3rd Overall Vuelta a Boyacá
 7th Overall Vuelta a Colombia
1st Stage 8
1987
 3rd Overall Vuelta a Colombia
1990
 1st  Overall Vuelta a Colombia
 1st  Overall Clásico RCN
1st Stage 8
 1st  Overall Vuelta a Antioquia
 3rd Overall Vuelta a Cundinamarca
1991
 1st Stage 8 Clásico RCN
1993
 1st Overall Vuelta a Chiriquí

References

External links

1962 births
Living people
Colombian male cyclists
People from Facatativá
Vuelta a Colombia stage winners